The Würzburg Cultural Prize (Kulturpreis der Stadt Würzburg) is an award by the city of Würzburg. It is awarded to people who are connected to Würzburg by birth, life or work and who worked towards its cultural life ("... eine durch Geburt, Leben oder Werk mit der Stadt Würzburg verbundene Persönlichkeit (bzw. eine Künstlergruppe/Ensemble o. ä.) erhalten, die durch ihr künstlerisches Schaffen herausragend gewirkt oder sich in besonderer Weise um das kulturelle Leben der Stadt verdient gemacht hat").

Recipients 
Recipients have included:
 1965: Friedrich Schnack, writer
 1966: Emy Roeder, sculptor and artist
 1967: Eugen Jochum, conductor
 1968: Fritz Koenig, sculptor
 1970: Günter Jena, organist and choral director
 1971: Josef Versl, artist
 1972: , architect
 1973: , actor and artist
 1974: Otto Sonnleitner, Bildhauer
 1975: , artist
 1976: , author
 1977: , artist
 1978: Rudolf Köckert, musician
 1979: , museum director
 1980: Werner Dettelbacher, author
 1981: Yehuda Amichai, poet
 1984: Wilhelm Greiner, artist
 1985: Siegfried Fink, percussionist
 1986: , cathedral music director
 1987: Waltraud Meier, mezzo-soprano
 1988: Bertold Hummel, composer
 1989: , sculptor
 1990: Lothar C. Forster, sculptor
 1991: Curd Lessig, artist
 1992: Dieter Stein, artist
 1994: Klaus Hinrich Stahmer, musician and composer
 1996: Joachim Koch, sculptor
 1998: Hans-Georg Noack, author
 2000: Norbert Glanzberg, composer
 2002: , cabarettist
 2004: , church music director
 2006: Bernd Glemser, pianist
 2007: , sculptor
 2009: 
 2010: Diana Damrau, soprano
 2012: Mathias Repiscus, stage director
 2014: Angelika Summa, sculptor
 2015: Hans Ulrich Gumbrecht, literary theorist

References 

German awards
Würzburg
Awards established in 1965